Grecian was a sailing ship built in England in 1824.  She was wrecked on Nine Mile Beach, New South Wales during a gale on 30 April 1864. Captain Grant lost his life.

References

 

1824 ships
Ships built in England
Shipwrecks of the Hunter Region
Brigs of Australia
Maritime incidents in April 1864
City of Lake Macquarie